Caribbean Rising Tour was a concert tour hosted by MTV Networks. It featured performances by more than eighty artists across several different musical genres including reggae, dancehall, reggaeton, soca, quelbe, hip hop, and calypso. The concert series was held in conjunction with the launch of Tempo Networks, which debuted "in 20 Caribbean markets, providing both original and acquired programming." The channel launched in the United States in 2006. The tour featured performances by mainstream artists such as Rihanna, The Game, Musiq Soulchild, Elephant Man, Wyclef Jean and Ivy Queen, among others.

Background
In October 2005, it was announced that MTV Networks would launch a "new cable television network devoted to Caribbean music and culture." In conjunction with the launch on November 21, MTV Networks announced the concert tour Caribbean Rising to be held in various countries in the Caribbean.

Tour dates

References

2005 concert tours